The George W. and Hetty A. Bowers House is a historic residence located in the Kerns neighborhood of Portland, Oregon, United States. The finest of only three poured-concrete houses in Portland, this 1910 residence was built at the height of the short-lived national trend of experimentation with this building method. Although the method largely died out soon after and especially never gained popularity in Portland, this house was at the cutting edge in its time.

The house was entered on the National Register of Historic Places in 2011.

See also
National Register of Historic Places listings in Northeast Portland, Oregon

References

External links
Oregon Historic Sites Database entry

Houses completed in 1910
1910 establishments in Oregon
Neoclassical architecture in Oregon
Houses on the National Register of Historic Places in Portland, Oregon
Kerns, Portland, Oregon